The 1969–70 Alpha Ethniki was the 34th season of the highest football league of Greece. The season began on 21 September 1969 and ended on 10 June 1970. Panathinaikos won their second consecutive and tenth Greek title.

The point system was: Win: 3 points - Draw: 2 points - Loss: 1 point.

League table

Results

Top scorers

External links
Greek Wikipedia
Official Greek FA Site
Greek SuperLeague official Site
SuperLeague Statistics

Alpha Ethniki seasons
Greece
1969–70 in Greek football leagues